Marcel Gagnon (born 2 May 1950) is a Canadian composer, singer, guitarist, and substance abuse counsellor.

Career 

Born  in Prince George, British Columbia, a member of the Lheidli T'enneh Band and the 16th of 20 children in his family, Gagnon was involved in music from his youth, playing for dances, weddings and private functions in central British Columbia, as well as for radio shows in Alberta and British Columbia.  His career was interrupted by severe alcoholism, but after undertaking a recovery program, he recorded his breakthrough album Crazy Maker at the Banff Centre for the Arts in 2001.  The album was nominated for a Best Music of Aboriginal Canada award in the Juno Awards of 2002.  He has produced two other albums.

In 1997, he graduated with a degree in addictions counselling. Acknowledging himself as a recovering alcoholic and a person affected by fetal alcohol syndrome disorder, Gagnon became a member of the Board of Directors of the Whitecrow Village FASD Society upon its inception in 2002.  He has become a prominent advocate and counsellor for persons affected by the Canadian Indian residential school system. Currently, he is an elder of the Lheidli T'enneh First Nation. He teaches spirituality, that "Man's struggle has always been dark against light. Positive versus negative. Our teaching is to recognize these two forces and which is the greater. The Medicine Man within, I refer to as Tsiyan/Grandfather. Bheni Hoolo is the darker force that wars within us. We (allow) that greater power within, Tsiyan, to help us to recognize and overcome Bheni Hoolo's influence." Gagnon is currently working with Indigenous youth in conflict with the law, presenting his program, "Awakening the Medicine Man Within," and performing music.

Discography

Albums 

Crazy Maker, 2001
The Watchman – Tom Crow, 2002 
Captured, 2006
New Years Day, 2009

References

External links 
  University of Northern British Columbia assets page

  Marcel Gagnon

Living people
1950 births
21st-century First Nations people
Canadian male singers
Canadian record producers
Dakelh people
Franco-Columbian people
Musicians from British Columbia
People from Prince George, British Columbia